Oireabhal (662 m) is a mountain in Harris, in the Outer Hebrides of Scotland.

The peak is the highest point on a complex ridge that runs from north to south. The northern side of the mountain includes its finest feature, an overhanging crag known as 'Sron Uladal'.

References

Mountains and hills of the Outer Hebrides
Marilyns of Scotland
Grahams
Landforms of the Outer Hebrides
Harris, Outer Hebrides